The Turkish Communist Party (TKF), often referred to as the "official" communist party, was a political party in Turkey.

History

Foundation 
The TKF was set up by Mustafa Kemal Atatürk in October 1920 in order to counter the influence of the Communist Party of Turkey (TKP). Yunus Nadi Abalıoğlu was the editor of the party organ.

TKF and Comintern 
At the end of 1920, the party applied for Comintern membership. On 22 November 1920, with the approval of the Grand National Assembly of Turkey, Turkish government sent a four-member delegation led by Tevfik Rüştü Aras on a mission to establish links with the Soviet government. On 8 June 1921, Tevfik Rüştü Aras published an article in support of the Turkish War of Independence in the French-language Comintern newspaper named Moscou. Following the pressure by Communist Party of Turkey, TKF was not accepted to the 3rd World Congress of the Communist International as a member.

Ban 
After the Çerkes Ethem uprising, all left wing parties including TKF were banned. Atatürk disbanded the party after a short existence of 3 months.

References

Defunct communist parties in Turkey
Political parties established in 1920
1920 establishments in the Ottoman Empire